Hesa Awal Kohistan District is a new district, created from the bigger Kohistan District in Kapisa Province, Afghanistan. The district center is Kohistan. The population is 60,300 (2006), mostly Tajik.

History 
The Kohistani Tajiks were the most powerful and best organized groups that fought against the British occupation of Kabul in 1879 to 1880.

See also 
 Kohistan

References 

District map of the former Kohestan District now split into Hesa Awal Kohistan District and Hesa Duwum Kohistan District
District Profile

External links 
Kohistani.Com - District Photo Gallery
Kohistan Discussion Forum
Kohistan Chat Room
Kohistan Web Site

Districts of Kapisa Province